Evenki or Evenk may refer to

Evenks, or Evenki, a people of Russia and China
Evenki languages, languages of Tungusic family
Evenki language, a subdivision of Evenki languages, spoken by Evenks
Evenk Autonomous Banner, a 3rd-level subdivision of Inner Mongolia, China
Evenk Ethnic Sum, a 4th-level subdivision of Inner Mongolia, China
Evenk Autonomous Okrug, a former subdivision of Russia's Krasnoyarsk Krai, now the Evenkiysky District

See also
 Evenkia (disambiguation)

Language and nationality disambiguation pages